This list contains all cultural property of national significance (class A) in the canton of Graubünden from the 2009 Swiss Inventory of Cultural Property of National and Regional Significance''. It is sorted by municipality and contains 174 individual buildings, 16 collections and 38 archaeological finds.  The names are given in either German, Italian or Romansh according to the majority language of the municipality.  Some names were translated for clarity.

The geographic coordinates provided are in the Swiss coordinate system as given in the inventory.:''' Top - A B C D F G H I J K L M P R S T U V W Z

Alvaneu

Albula/Alvra

Andeer

Arosa

Avers

Bergün Filisur

Bever

Bregaglia

Breil/Brigels

Brienz/Brinzauls

Brusio

Calanca

Calfreisen

Castrisch

Cazis

Celerina/Schlarigna

Chur

Churwalden

Davos

Disentis/Mustér

Domat/Ems

Domleschg

Duvin

Falera

Felsberg

Fideris

Fläsch

Flims

Fürstenau

Grono

Grüsch

Ilanz/Glion

Jenins

Klosters-Serneus

Küblis

La Punt Chamues-ch

Landquart

Lantsch/Lenz

Lohn

Lumnezia

Luven

Luzein

Maienfeld

Malans

Medel (Lucmagn)

Mesocco

Mutten

Pontresina

Poschiavo

Rhäzüns

Rheinwald

Riom-Parsonz

Rossa

Rothenbrunnen

Roveredo

Safiental

Sagogn

Samedan

San Vittore

Santa Maria in Calanca

S-chanf

Scharans

Schiers

Schluein

Schmitten

Scuol

Seewis im Prättigau

Sils im Domleschg

Soazza

St. Antönien

St. Moritz

Stierva

Sumvitg

Surava

Surses

Susch

Tamins

Thusis

Trin

Trun

Untervaz

Val Müstair

Vals

Valsot

Vaz/Obervaz

Waltensburg/Vuorz

Zernez

Zillis-Reischen

Zizers

Zuoz

References
 All entries, addresses and coordinates are from:

External links
 Swiss Inventory of Cultural Property of National and Regional Significance, 2009 edition:

PDF documents: Class B objects
Geographic information system

Grisons
.
 01
.
Tourist attractions in Graubünden